Humberto Toledo Valverde (born August 10, 1979) is an Ecuadorian professional boxer. He's the former WBC Latino Super Featherweight and is the current WBC FECARBOX Lightweight champion.

Professional career
In February 2007, Toledo lost to future three-time WBC champion Humberto Soto.

WBC FECARBOX Lightweight Championship
On October 16, 2009 Humberto beat Samir Torres to win the WBC FECARBOX Lightweight Championship.

References

External links

Light-welterweight boxers
1979 births
Living people
Sportspeople from Esmeraldas, Ecuador
Ecuadorian male boxers
21st-century Ecuadorian people